Little Rapids is an unincorporated community located in the town of Lawrence, Brown County, Wisconsin, United States.

History
A post office called Little Rapids was established in 1873, and remained in operation until it was discontinued in 1939. The community took its name from rapids on a stream near the town site.

References

Unincorporated communities in Brown County, Wisconsin
Unincorporated communities in Wisconsin
Green Bay metropolitan area